The Timor python (Malayopython timoriensis) is a python species found in Southeast Asia. A dwarf species, no subspecies are recognized as being valid. Like all pythons, it is a nonvenomous constrictor; unlike larger species such as the reticulated python, it is not considered dangerous to humans.

Description
It has a series of heat-sensing pits between its nostrils and mouth used to find warm-blooded prey in total darkness. It is cold-blooded.

Geographic range
M. timoriensis is found in Southeast Asia on the Lesser Sunda Islands (Flores, Lombien and Timor islands), its type locality is given as "Kupang, (Timor)" [Indonesia].

Behavior
M. timoriensis is partly arboreal.

Feeding
Captive specimens of M. timoriensis have been known to accept birds and small mammals.

Reproduction
M. timoriensis is oviparous.

Taxonomy
Liasis amethystinus var. timoriensis was the scientific name proposed by Wilhelm Peters in 1876.

Authors of a phylogenetic study suggested that the Timor python together with the reticulated python should be moved to a distinct genus Broghammerus. Subsequent phylogenetic analyses have supported the separation of the Timor and reticulated pythons from genus Python. However, Broghammerus is considered an invalid name by most authorities, which made R. Graham Reynolds et al. formally rename this clade Malayopython in 2014, a decision that was followed by many authors.

References

Further reading
Boulenger GA (1893). Catalogue of the Snakes in the British Museum (Natural History). Volume I. Containing the Families ... Boidæ ... London: Trustees of the British Museum (Natural History). (Taylor and Francis, printers). xiii + 448 pp. + Plates I-XXVIII. ("Python timorensis [sic]", p. 85).

External links

Pythonidae
Reptiles of Timor
Reptiles of Indonesia
Reptiles described in 1876
Taxa named by Wilhelm Peters